Lonely or The Lonely may refer to:

Loneliness, an emotional response to perceived isolation

Music

EPs
Lonely (Frente! EP) or the title song, 1994
Lonely (Spica EP) or the title song, 2012

Songs
"Lonely" (2NE1 song), 2011
"Lonely" (Akon song), 2005
"Lonely" (Casey Donovan song), 2017
"Lonely" (DaBaby and Lil Wayne song), 2021
"Lonely" (Diplo song), 2019
"Lonely" (Eddie Cochran song), 1960
"Lonely" (Joel Corry song), 2020
"Lonely" (Jonghyun song), 2017
"Lonely" (Justin Bieber and Benny Blanco song), 2020
"Lonely" (Maluma and Jennifer Lopez song), 2020
"Lonely" (Mao Abe song), 2010
"Lonely" (Matoma song), 2018
"Lonely" (Medina song), 2010
"Lonely" (Merril Bainbridge song), 1998
"Lonely" (Nana song), 1997
"Lonely" (Peter Andre song), 1997
"Lonely" (Shannon Noll song), 2006
"Lonely" (Sistar Song), 2017
"Lonely" (Tracy Lawrence song), 2000
"L-O-N-E-L-Y", by Bobby Vinton, 1965
"The Lonely" (British Sea Power song), 2002
"The Lonely" (Christina Perri song), 2011
"Lonely", by Alan Walker from Different World, 2018
"Lonely", by American Music Club from California, 1988
"Lonely", by Atreyu from Congregation of the Damned, 2010
"Lonely", by Attack Attack! from Attack Attack!, 2010
"Lonely", by B1A4 from Who Am I, 2014
"Lonely", by Bon Jovi from Lost Highway, 2007
"Lonely", by Britney Spears from Britney, 2001
"Lonely", by Chloe x Halle from Ungodly Hour, 2020
"Lonely", by Crimson Glory from Transcendence, 1988
"Lonely", by Danny Brown from Old, 2013
"Lonely", by Demi Lovato featuring Lil Wayne from Tell Me You Love Me, 2017
"Lonely", by Emeli Sandé from Long Live the Angels, 2016
"Lonely", by Foreigner from Can't Slow Down, 2009
"Lonely", by Gabry Ponte and Jerome, 2020
"Lonely", by Hyolyn from Love & Hate, 2013
"Lonely", by Illenium from Ascend, 2019
"Lonely", by Imagine Dragons from Mercury – Act 1, 2021
"Lonely", by Jamila Woods from Heavn, 2016
"Lonely", by Janet Jackson from Rhythm Nation 1814, 1989
"Lonely", by Julian Lennon from Valotte, 1984
"Lonely", by Lauv from Fuck, I'm Lonely, 2019
"Lonely", by Líbido from Lo Último que Hable Ayer, 2005
"Lonely", by Lil Pump, 2021
"Lonely", by Machine Gun Kelly from Tickets to My Downfall, 2020
"Lonely", by Nav from Nav, 2017
"Lonely", by Ne-Yo from In My Own Words, 2006
"Lonely", by Noah Cyrus from The End of Everything, 2020
"Lonely", by PrettyMuch, 2021
"Lonely", by Pseudo Echo from Ultraviolet, 2014
"Lonely", by Tom Waits from Closing Time, 1973
"Lonely", by Tones and I from Welcome to the Madhouse, 2021
"Lonely (Amy's Theme)", by the Lovin' Spoonful from You're a Big Boy Now, 1967

Other uses
Lonely (fashion label), a New Zealand clothing brand
"The Lonely", a 1959 episode of The Twilight Zone

See also

Alone (disambiguation)
Lone (disambiguation)
Loneliness (disambiguation)